Nicolas Schmit (born 10 December 1953) is a politician from Luxembourg serving as European Commissioner for Jobs and Social Rights since 2019. A member of the Luxembourg Socialist Workers' Party (LSAP), he was previously a member of the government of Luxembourg from 2004 to 2019 and a Member of the European Parliament (MEP) in 2019.

Early life and education
Schmit studied economics in France at the Institut d'études politiques d'Aix-en-Provence.

Career
In 1979, Schmit started his political and diplomatic career as an attaché in the Prime Minister's office in Luxembourg, followed by the Foreign Ministry. In 1989, he became Secretary to the LSAP's delegation in the Chamber of Deputies. He was appointed to the Council of State on 29 October 1991, replacing René Grégorius.

In 2004, Schmit was appointed to the first Juncker-Asselborn Ministry as Minister-Delegate for Foreign Affairs and Immigration, working under Jean Asselborn as Minister for Foreign Affairs.

After the 2009 election, in which Schmit was elected for the Est constituency as the sole LSAP deputy, he did not take his seat but was reappointed to the government. He was promoted to the office of Minister of Labour, Employment and Immigration of Luxembourg. He is the chairman of the EPSCO network of the Party of European Socialists.

Since the 2019 European elections, Schmit has been a Member of the European Parliament, where he belongs to the Progressive Alliance of Socialists and Democrats (S&D) group. He has since been serving on the Committee on Employment and Social Affairs.

Controversy
In January 2011, Xavier Bettel claimed that Schmit exerted undue influence on the Grand Ducal Police to drop charges against his 18-year-old son the previous month. Schmit denied that his assistance of his son amounted to undue influence, saying that his 'conscience is clear'.

Personal life
He is married and has four children.

Footnotes

External links
 Bio of Schmit on government website

1953 births
Living people
Luxembourg Socialist Workers' Party politicians
Luxembourgian European Commissioners
Luxembourgian expatriates in France
Members of the Council of State of Luxembourg
MEPs for Luxembourg 2019–2024
Sciences Po Aix alumni
European Commissioners 2019–2024